The 1999 European Wrestling Championships were held in the Greco-Romane style in Sofia 13 – 16 May 1999;   the men's Freestyle style in Minsk  15 – 18 April 1999, and the women's freestyle in Götzis  24 April – 1 May 1999.

Medal table

Medal summary

Men's freestyle

Men's Greco-Roman

Women's freestyle

References

External links
Fila's official championship website

Europe
W
W
European Wrestling Championships
Euro
Sports competitions in Sofia
Sports competitions in Minsk
1999 in European sport